Rusija may refer to:

 The South Slavic and Baltic name for Russia
 A song from Yugoslav album Odbrana i poslednji dani